Brain Breaker is a side-scrolling action-adventure platform game released for the Sharp X1 in 1985. It is an early example of the Metroidvania genre.

Plot

The player's spaceship crash lands on a mysterious alien planet, whose inhabitants have seemingly vanished. The player, starting with no possessions other than a radio, must venture into the wilderness to find equipment, items, etc., in order to discover the planet's true nature.

Gameplay

Brain Breaker is a side-scrolling game taking place in a large, interconnected world. At the beginning of the game, the player can do little but run, jump, and radio their ship for clues, but by exploring the planet, they will find new items that will expand their abilities, such as a laser rifle, a jetpack, wall-melting psychic powers, and the eponymous Brain Breaker, which disables electronic devices. Items can be picked up and dropped using the Z key, while the F-keys can be used to call one's ship and create a save state at the current position. The player can enter buildings containing elevators, which function similarly to those in Elevator Action and Impossible Mission. Eventually, the player will be able to reach the planet's central computer, which has gone rogue and must be destroyed.

Development

The game was developed entirely by Hiroshi Ishikawa, who describes it in a 2010 interview for Hardcore Gaming 101 as a difficult project, taking over 18 months and 20 times the amount of coding as his previous game, Kagirinaki Tatakai. Ishikawa, born in 1967, was in his last year of high school at the time and completed the game just before he took his university entrance exams. Ishikawa is now a professor at an undisclosed Japanese university.

References

External links
Brain Breaker at Giant Bomb
Brain Breaker  at Hardcore Gaming 101
Inverview with Hiroshi Ishikawa at Hardcore Gaming 101

1985 video games
Action-adventure games
Enix games
Japan-exclusive video games
Metroidvania games
Platform games
Post-apocalyptic video games
Science fiction video games
Sharp X1 games
Sharp X1-only games
Video games developed in Japan
Video games set on fictional planets